The Nanosatellite Launch System (NLS) is a series of satellite launch missions launched 2003–2010, coordinated by the Space Flight Laboratory (SFL) of the University of Toronto Institute for Aerospace Studies (UTIAS).

NLS has provided low-cost launch services for a number of nanosatellites.

Missions

NLS 1 
 Launch date: 30 June 2003
 Launch vehicle: Rockot
 Launch site: Plesetsk Cosmodrome
 Participants:  CanX-1,  AAUSAT-1,  DTUsat

NLS 4 
 Launch date: 28 April 2008
 Launch vehicle: Polar Satellite Launch Vehicle (PSLV-C9)
 Launch site: Satish Dhawan Space Centre, Second Launch Pad
 Participants:  CanX-2,  AAUSAT-II,  COMPASS-1,  Delfi-C3,   CUTE-1.7+APD II and  SEEDS II

NLS 5 
 Launch date: 28 April 2008
 Launch vehicle: Polar Satellite Launch Vehicle (PSLV-C9)
 Launch site: Satish Dhawan Space Centre, Second Launch Pad
 Participants:  CanX-6/NTS

NLS 6 
 Launch date : July 12, 2010
 Launch vehicle: Polar Satellite Launch Vehicle (PSLV-C15) 
 Launch site: Satish Dhawan Space Centre, First Launch Pad
 Participants:  AISSat-1,  TIsat-1

NLS 8 
 Launch date : 25 February 2013
 Launch vehicle: Polar Satellite Launch Vehicle (PSLV-C15)
 Launch site: Satish Dhawan Space Centre, First Launch Pad
 Participants:  Sapphire,  NEOSSat,  TUGSAT-1,  UniBRITE-1,  STRaND-1,  AAUSAT3

Notes

References

 F. M. Pranajaya, R. E. Zee, P. L. Thomsen, M. Blanke, R. Wisniewski, L. Franklin, and J. Puig-Suari, "An Affordable, Low-Risk Approach to Launching Research Spacecraft as Tertiary Payloads," Proc. 17th Annual AIAA/USC Conference on Small Satellites, Logan, Utah, Aug. 2003.

Space launch vehicles of Canada